The Cimarron Fuel Fabrication Site was a nuclear fuel production facility located by the Cimarron River near Cimarron City, Oklahoma. It was operated by Kerr-McGee Corporation (KMC) from 1965 to 1975.

History 

Some of the byproducts and waste from Kerr-McGee's uranium and thorium processing at its Cushing, Oklahoma refinery were transported to Cimarron in the 1960s.

The Atomic Energy Commission (AEC) issued Radioactive Materials License SNM-928 in 1965 to Kerr-McGee Corporation for the uranium fuel fabrication facilities at the Cimarron site. Later, the AEC issued Radioactive Materials License SNM-1174 in 1970 to KMC for the mixed oxide fuel fabrication (MOFF) facilities at the Cimarron site.

The plant made uranium fuel and MOX driver fuel pins for use in the Fast Flux Test Facility at the Hanford Site in Washington State. Along with NUMEC, between 1973 and 1975 Kerr-McGee made the fuel pins for FFTF cores 1 and 2. The pins were quality tested by the Plutonium Finishing Plant at Hanford.  The MOX pins were created by the unusual co-precipitation of Plutonium Nitrate and Uranium Nitrate solution method.  The plant shut down in 1976.

In 1983 Kerr-McGee Nuclear split into Quivira Mining Corporation and Sequoyah Fuels Corporation, although both were still owned by Kerr-McGee. Sequoyah got the Cimarron plant. Sequoyah was then sold to General Atomics in 1988, but Kerr-McGee kept control of Cimarron under a subsidiary named the Cimarron Corporation. In 2005 Kerr-McGee formed a new subsidiary named Tronox, and it then gained ownership of Cimarron. Tronox was then spun off as an independent company in 2006, a few months before KMC was bought by Anadarko Petroleum. Tronox went bankrupt in 2008/2009, blaming in part the environmental debts it inherited from KMC. Tronox shareholders later sued Anadarko Petroleum (KMC's successor) for having misled investors.

Investigations

In 1975, the United States General Accounting Office published a report, Federal Investigations Into Certain Health, Safety, Quality Control and Criminal Allegations at Kerr-McGee Nuclear Corporation. In the report, the Comptroller General of the United States reported on working conditions at the Kerr-McGee Nuclear Corporation; radiological contamination and death of Karen Silkwood (an employee); and Kerr-McGee's quality assurance practices. The investigating agencies were the Federal Bureau of Investigation, the Atomic Energy Commission; the Energy Research and Development Administration, and the Nuclear Regulatory Commission. These agencies studied Karen Silkwood's contamination with plutonium; the dispersion of uranium pellets on the grounds of the plant; and the unauthorized removal and possession of nuclear material from the plant.

Karen Silkwood

Karen Silkwood was employed by the facility when she died in a mysterious car crash after her union activism and whistleblowing. The summary of the abovementioned report of the US General Accounting Office concluded that Karen Silkwood was contaminated with plutonium on November 5, 6 and 7, 1974. On November 5, she was contaminated by the gloves of a laboratory glovebox used for working with plutonium. However, when Kerr-McGee examined and tested the gloves, no leaks were found. On November 6, she was again found to be contaminated. And on November 7, her nose and other parts of her body were found to be contaminated with plutonium, as was her apartment and roommate.

Notes 

Nuclear fuel infrastructure in the United States
Nuclear technology in the United States
Buildings and structures in Logan County, Oklahoma
1965 establishments in Oklahoma
1976 disestablishments in Oklahoma